Asylum is a 1972 documentary film written and directed by Peter Robinson about a therapeutic community for people with schizophrenia at Philadelphia Association Communities in London. It features the co-founders of the community, Leon Redler and the psychiatrist R. D. Laing.

References

External links

1972 films
1970s English-language films
1972 documentary films
Documentary films about schizophrenia
Films shot in London
British documentary films
1970s British films